Robert Bonnin Barry (December 21, 1956 – June 20, 2015), sometimes known by the abbreviated nickname "BBJ", was an American sportscaster.

Barry spent most of his broadcasting career at NBC affiliate KFOR-TV (channel 4) in Oklahoma City, Oklahoma, and served as the station's sports director for 17 years. At the time of his death, he was main sports anchor for the station's weeknight 5:00, 6:00 and 10:00 p.m. newscasts and hosted the 15-minute weekly sports highlight show that airs within the 10:00 p.m. newscast, Friday Sports Overtime. In addition to his duties at KFOR-TV, he also served as host of Sports Morning on sports radio station WWLS (640 AM, now ESPN Radio affiliate KWPN; and 104.9 FM, now at 98.1) since 1993, co-hosting the drive time talk show with former Oklahoma State University football coach Pat Jones.

Early life
Bob Barry Jr. was born in Norman, Oklahoma, to Robert Guyton Barry, a/k/a Bob Barry Sr. (February 28, 1931 – October 30, 2011) and Joan Barry (née Hester) (October 15, 1932 – June 10, 2003). He had an older brother, John Franklin Barry. A member of the Oklahoma Kappa chapter of Sigma Alpha Epsilon, Barry graduated from the University of Oklahoma in 1980, with a Bachelor of Arts in Radio/TV/Film-Journalism.

Career
Barry began his career in radio during his sophomore year attending Norman High School in 1973. His television career began in Oklahoma City in September 1980 as sports director for independent station KAUT-TV (channel 43; which became co-owned with KFOR-TV in 2006), when that station signed on with a daytime-only all-news format that lasted until the following year. In 1981, he became a sports anchor at CBS affiliate KAUZ-TV in Wichita Falls, Texas. He subsequently returned to Oklahoma City, joining KTVY (now KFOR-TV) – where his father, Bob Barry Sr., had been its main sports anchor since 1966 – as weekend sports anchor in August 1982. Barry has hosted several coaches shows for both the University of Oklahoma and Oklahoma State University.

In 1998, Barry assumed duties as KFOR's sports director, a position that had been held by Bob Barry Sr. since 1970. Barry Jr. and Barry Sr. worked together at KFOR-TV, until his father's retirement from the station in 2008. Barry was very active in sports charity while he worked for the station. He created the basketball team "The Foul Shots", consisting of KFOR-TV personalities, in the early 1980s and served as the team's head coach and general manager.

Barry was voted "Oklahoma Sportscaster of the Year" by the National Sportscasters and Sportswriters Association in 2003, 2004 and 2008. The Jim Thorpe Association awarded Bob the "Executive Council Service Award" for his positive contribution to the Association, and was also honored by the American Women in Radio and TV as "Oklahoma's Sportscaster of the Year".

Personal life
Barry resided Edmond, Oklahoma. He married Gina France (née Wigington) on June 15, 2002. He was previously married to Julianne (née Fudge) on August 15, 1981, and they had three children, namely Evan Elizabeth Barry (Born 1984), Matthew Hudson Barry (Born 1987) and Grace Katherine Glasgow Barry (Born 1991).

Death
Barry died on June 20, 2015, from head trauma received when his motor scooter collided with the driver's side door of a car that unexpectedly attempted to perform an illegal U-turn northbound around 4:00 p.m. that afternoon from the right lane near 142nd Street and May Avenue in northwest Oklahoma City by crossing both southbound lanes. According to police reports, paramedics and firefighters performed CPR on Barry before he was rushed to the trauma facility at OU Medical Center by Emergency Medical Services Authority(EMSA), where he died due to the severity of his injuries.

The driver of the car Barry crashed into, Gustavo Castillo Gutierrez (born June 28, 1988), was arrested on criminal complaints of manslaughter, causing an accident while operating a vehicle without a driver's license, and making an illegal U-turn. He was also charged with possession of a controlled dangerous substance when jailers found a one-half gram bag of cocaine in Gutierrez's possession. Gutierrez was placed on an immigration hold at the Oklahoma County Jail until his legal status in the United States was determined, prohibiting him from being released even if he is able to post a set $18,500 bond. Gutierrez was formally arraigned on the multiple complaints on June 22, appearing before a judge via video link from the jail facility; a court date will be set for Gutierrez upon filing of charges against him. Gutierrez was deported from the United States thrice before this fatal accident. A public memorial service for Barry was held on June 26, 2015, at Crossings Community Church in Oklahoma City. Gutierrez was convicted on January 21, 2016, of causing the accident (for which he was given a five-year prison sentence), and for cocaine possession (for which he was sentenced to an additional ten years in prison). He will be eligible for parole in September 2023.

Gutierrez's involvement in Barry's death was the subject of an advertisement for the campaign of Gary Richardson, a Tulsa-based attorney running for the Republican nomination to replace the term-limited Governor Mary Fallin in the 2018 Oklahoma Gubernatorial election, in an effort to promote his anti-illegal immigration stance. KFOR/KAUT General Manager Wes Milbourn noted that the duopoly was obligated to run the ad as it met FCC campaign advertising requirements, but noted that "we were displeased with their advertising tactics and the exploitation of Bob Barry [Jr.]". In a written statement, Barry's son, Matthew, said that "the Barry Family finds it deeply concerning that Mr. Richardson chose to feature the tragic and untimely death of our [f]ather in his campaign advertisement without seeking consent. [... W]e find it very troubling that Mr. Richardson ran an advertisement that could imply that the Barry family endorses in any way his election as Governor of the State of Oklahoma. In sum, the Barry family does not appreciate the liberties taken by Mr. Richardson and his campaign; and condemn the utter lack of respect shown towards our tragic loss.”

References

American sports announcers
Sports in Oklahoma City
Road incident deaths in Oklahoma
Sportspeople from Norman, Oklahoma
1956 births
2015 deaths
University of Oklahoma alumni